The Arkansas Traveler is a 1938 American comedy film directed by Alfred Santell and written by Viola Brothers Shore and George Sessions Perry. The film stars Bob Burns, Fay Bainter, John Beal, Jean Parker, Lyle Talbot and Irvin S. Cobb. The film was released on October 14, 1938, by Paramount Pictures.

Plot
The Arkansas Traveler, an itinerant printer, returns to a small town to help save a newspaper started by his friend who has died.

Cast 
Bob Burns as The Arkansas Traveler
Fay Bainter as Mrs. Martha Allen
John Beal as John 'Johnnie' Daniels
Jean Parker as Judy Allen
Lyle Talbot as Matt Collins
Irvin S. Cobb as Town Constable
Dickie Moore as Benjamin Franklin 'Benny' Allen
Porter Hall as  Mayor Daniels

References

External links 
 

1938 films
1930s English-language films
Paramount Pictures films
American comedy films
1938 comedy films
Films directed by Alfred Santell
American black-and-white films
1930s American films